Toshiaphaenops is a genus of beetles in the family Carabidae, containing the following species:

 Toshiaphaenops globipennis Ueno, 1999
 Toshiaphaenops ovicollis Ueno, 1999

References

Trechinae